Savinien de Cyrano de Bergerac (6 March 1619 – 28 July 1655) was a French novelist, playwright, epistolarian, and duelist.

A bold and innovative author, his work was part of the libertine literature of the first half of the 17th century. Today, he is best known as the inspiration for Edmond Rostand's most noted drama, Cyrano de Bergerac (1897), which, although it includes elements of his life, also contains invention and myth.

Since the 1970s, there has been a resurgence in the study of Cyrano, demonstrated in the abundance of theses, essays, articles and biographies published in France and elsewhere.

Life

Sources 

Cyrano's short life is poorly documented. Certain significant chapters of his life are known only from the Preface to the Histoire Comique par Monsieur de Cyrano Bergerac, Contenant les Estats & Empires de la Lune (Comical History of the States and Empires of the Moon) published in 1657, nearly two years after his death. Without Henri Le Bret, who wrote the biographical information, his country childhood, his military engagement, the injuries it caused, his prowess as a swordsman, the circumstances of his death and his supposed final conversion would remain unknown.

Since 1862, when Auguste Jal revealed that the “Lord of Bergerac” was Parisian and not Gascon, research in parish registries and notarial records by a small number of researchers, in particular Madeleine Alcover of Rice University, has allowed the public to know more about his genealogy, his family, his home in Paris and those of some of his friends, but has revealed no new documents that support or refute the essentials of Le Bret's account or fill the gaps in his narrative.

Family 
Savinien II de Cyrano was the son of Abel I de Cyrano, lord of Mauvières, (156?-1648), counsel (avocat) of the Parliament of Paris, and of Espérance Bellanger (1586-164?), "daughter of deceased nobleman Estienne Bellanger, Counsellor of the King and Treasurer of his Finances".

Ancestors 

His paternal grandfather, Savinien I de Cyrano (15??-1590), was probably born into a notable family from Sens in Burgundy. Documents describe him in turn as a "merchant and burgher of Paris" (« marchand et bourgeois de Paris » 20 May 1555), "(sea-)fish merchant to the King" (« vendeur de poisson de mer pour le Roy ») in several other documents in following years, and finally "Royal counsellor" (« conseiller du Roi, maison et couronne de France » 7 April 1573). In Paris, on 9April 1551, he married Anne Le Maire, daughter of Estienne Le Maire and Perrette Cardon, who died in 1616. They are known to have had four children: Abel (the writer's father), Samuel (15??-1646), Pierre (15??-1626) and Anne (15??-1652).

Of his maternal grandfather, Estienne Bellanger, "Financial Controller of the Parisian general revenue" (« contrôleur des finances en la recette générale de Paris »), and of his background, we know almost nothing. We know more about his wife, Catherine Millet, whose father, Guillaume II Millet, Lord of Caves, was secretary of the King's finances, and whose grandfather, Guillaume I Millet (149?-1563), qualified in medicine in 1518, was doctor to three kings in succession (Francis I, Henry II and Francis II). He married Catherine Valeton, daughter of a property tax collector from Nantes, Audebert Valeton, who, accused of involvement in the Affair of the Placards, was "burned alive on wood taken from his house" on 21 January 1535 at the crossroads of la Croix du Trahoir (the intersection of the Rue de l'Arbre-Sec and the Rue Saint-Honoré), in front of the Pavillon des singes, where Molière lived almost a century later.

Parents 

Espérance Bellanger and Abel I de Cyrano were married on 3September 1612 at the church of St-Gervais-et-St-Protais. She was at least twenty-six years old; he was about forty-five. Their marriage contract, signed the previous 12July at the office of Master Denis Feydeau, counsellor, secretary and king's notary, second cousin of the bride, was only published in the year 2000 by Madeleine Alcover, who minutely traces the fate of the witnesses (and more particularly their links with pious milieus) and notes that many of them "had entered the worlds of high finance, the noblesse de robe, of the aristocracy (including the Court) and even the noblesse d'épée".

His father's library 

In 1911 Jean Lemoine made known the inventory of Abel de Cyrano's worldly goods. His library, relatively poorly stocked (126 volumes), testifies to his schooling as a jurist and to an open curiosity: a taste for languages and ancient literature, the great humanists of the Renaissance (Erasmus, Rabelais, Juan Luis Vives), knowledge of Italian, interest in the sciences. On the religious side, one notices the presence of two Bibles, of an Italian New Testament and the Prayers of St. Basil in Greek, but no pious works. There is no object of that kind (engraving, painting, statue, crucifix) amongst the other inventoried items, but in contrast "twelve small paintings of portraits of gods and goddesses" and "four wax figures: one of Venus and Cupid, another of a woman pulling a thorn, one of a flageolet player and one of an ashamed nude woman". Finally, one notes the presence of several books by well-known Protestants: the Discours politiques et militaires ("Political and Military Discourse") of François de la Noue, two volumes of George Buchanan, the Dialectique of Pierre de La Ramée, the Alphabet de plusieurs sortes de lettres ("Alphabet of different kinds of letters") by master calligrapher Pierre Hamon and La Vérité de la religion chrétienne ("The Truth of the Christian Religion") by Philippe Duplessis-Mornay, whose presence confirms that Abel spent his younger years in Huguenot surroundings.

Siblings 

Espérance and Abel I had at least six children:
 Denis, baptised at the church of Saint-Eustache on 31 March 1614 by Anne Le Maire, his grandmother, and Denis Feydeau, financier. He studied Theology at the Sorbonne and died in the 1640s;
 Antoine, baptized at Saint-Eustache on 11 February 1616 by his paternal aunt, Anne Cyrano, and a godfather who is not named in the baptismal register discovered by Auguste Jal, but who might have been the financier Antoine Feydeau (1573–1628), younger brother of Denis. Died at a young age;
 Honoré, baptized at Saint-Eustache on 3July 1617 by Honoré Barentin, trésorier des parties casuelles, and an unnamed godmother. Died at a young age;
 Savinien II (1619–1655),
 Abel II, born around 1624, who took the title "Lord of Mauvières" after the death of his father in 1648;
 Catherine, whose date of birth is not known and who died in the early years of the following century, having become a nun at the convent of the Filles de la Croix (de Paris) ("Daughters of the Cross (Paris)") in the Rue de Charonne in 1641, under the name Sister Catherine de Sainte-Hyacinthe.

Childhood and adolescence

Baptism and godparents 

The historian Auguste Jal discovered the baptism of the (then) supposed Gascon in the 1860s:

Finally, after long exertion, I knew that Abel Cyrano had left the neighbourhood of Saint-Eustache for that of Saint-Sauveur, and that Espérance Bellanger had given birth in this new dwelling to a boy whose baptismal record is as follows: "The sixth of March one thousand six hundred and nineteen, Savinien, son of Abel de Cyrano, squire, Lord of Mauvières, and of the lady Espérance Bellenger (sic), the godfather, nobleman Antoine Fanny, King's Counsellor and Auditor in his Court of Finances, of this parish, the godmother the lady Marie Fédeau (sic), wife of nobleman Master Louis Perrot, Counsellor and Secretary to the King, Household and Crown of France, of the parish of Saint-Germain-l'Auxerrois". This son of Abel de Cyrano who was not given the name of his godfather, Antoine, because he had a brother of that name, born in 1616, but was named Savinien in memory of his grandfather, who could doubt that this was the Savinien Cyrano who was born, according to the biographers, at the chateau of Bergerac in or around 1620?

Thus Espérance Bellanger was thirty-three years old, Abel de Cyrano around fifty-two.

The surname Fanny appears nowhere in the very complete study of La Chambre des comptes de Paris ("Court of Finances of Paris") published by Count H. Coustant d'Yanville in 1875 (or for that matter in any other French document of the 17th century). In 1898, Viscount Oscar de Poli suggested that it must have been a transcription error and proposed reading it as Lamy. An Antoine Lamy had actually been accepted as an auditor of finances on 2September 1602, a year before Pierre de Maupeou, Espérance Bellanger's cousin and son-in-law of Denis Feydeau who was a witness to the marriage of Savinien's parents in 1612. His wife, Catherine Vigor, associate of Vincent de Paul, would become President of the Confrérie de la Charité de Gentilly ("Charitable Fellowship of Gentilly") where the couple set up a mission in 1634. She could well be the godmother of Catherine de Cyrano.

Marie Feydeau, cosponsor with Antoine Lamy, was the sister of Denis and Antoine Feydeau and the wife of Louis (or Loys) Perrot (15??-1625), who, apart from his titles of "King's Counsellor and Secretary", also had that of "King's Interpreter of Foreign Languages".

Mauvières and Bergerac 

In 1622, Abel de Cyrano left Paris with his family and went to settle on his lands at Mauvières and Bergerac in the Vallée de Chevreuse, which had come to him in part after the death of his mother in 1616.

His possessions, situated on the banks of the Yvette River in the parish of Saint-Forget, had been purchased by Savinien I de Cyrano forty years earlier from Thomas de Fortboys, who had bought them himself in 1576 from Lord Dauphin de Bergerac (or Bergerat), whose ancestors had possessed them for more than a century.

When Savinien I de Cyrano acquired it, the domain of Mauvières consisted of "a habitable mansion…with a lower room, a cellar beneath, kitchen, pantry, an upper chamber, granaries, stables, barn, portal, all roofed with tiles, with courtyard, walled dovecote; mill, enclosed plot, garden and fishpond, the right of middle and low justice…".

The estate of Bergerac, which adjoined Mauvières, "comprised a house with portal, courtyard, barn, hovel and garden, being an acre or thereabouts, plus forty-six and a half acres, of which thirty-six and a half were farmland and ten woodland, with the rights of middle and low justice".

Country schooling 

It was in this rustic setting that the child grew up and in the neighbouring parish he learnt to read and write. His friend Le Bret recalls:

The education that we had together with a good country priest who took in boarders, made us friends from our most tender youth, and I remember the aversion he had from that time for one who seemed to him a shadow of Sidias, because, in the thoughts which that man could somewhat grasp, he believed him incapable of teaching him anything; so that he paid so little attention to his lessons and his corrections that his father, who was a fine old gentleman, fairly unconcerned for his children's education and overly credulous of this one's complaints, removed him [from the school] a little too suddenly and, without considering if his son would be better off elsewhere, he sent him to that city [Paris] where he left him, until the age of nineteen years, to his own devices.

Parisian adolescence 

It is unknown at what age Savinien arrived in Paris. He may have been accommodated by his uncle Samuel de Cyrano in a large family residence in the Rue des Prouvaires, where his parents had lived up until 1618. In this theory, it was there that he was introduced to his cousin Pierre, with whom, according to Le Bret, he would build a lasting friendship.

He continued his secondary studies at an academy which remains unknown. It has long been maintained that he attended the Collège de Beauvais where the action of the comedy Le pédant joué takes place and whose principal, Jean Grangier would inspire the character of Granger, the pedant of Le pédant joué, but his presence in June 1641 as a student of rhetoric at the Collège de Lisieux (see below), has encouraged more recent historians to revise that opinion.

In 1636, his father sold Mauvières and Bergerac to Antoine Balestrier, Lord of Arbalestre, and returned to Paris to live with his family in "a modest dwelling at the top of the great Rue du Faubourg Saint-Jacques close to the Crossing" (parish of Saint-Jacques and Saint-Philippe), a short distance from the Collège de Lisieux. But there is no certainty that Savinien went to live with them.

A slippery slope 

Le Bret continues his story:

That age when nature is most easily corrupted, and that great liberty he had to only do that which seemed good to him, brought him to a dangerous weakness (penchant), which I dare say I stopped…

Historians and biographers do not agree on this penchant which threatened to corrupt Cyrano's nature. As an example of the romantic imagination of some biographers, Frédéric Lachèvre wrote:
Against an embittered and discontented father, Cyrano promptly forgot the way to his father's house. Soon he was counted among the gluttons and hearty drinkers of the best inns, with them he gave himself up to jokes of questionable taste, usually following prolonged libations…He also picked up the deplorable habit of gambling. This kind of life could not continue indefinitely, especially since Abel de Cyrano had become completely deaf to his son's repeated requests for funds.

Forty years later, two editors added to the realism and local colour:

Since nothing binds Cyrano to the humble lodgings of the Rue du Faubourg Saint-Jacques to which the uncertainties of fate condemned his family, he gives himself over entirely to Paris, to its streets and, according to the words of one of his close friends, "to its excrescences" (à ses verrues). He drinks, diligently frequents the Rue Glatigny, called Val d'amour, because of the women who sell pleasure there, gambles, roams the sleeping city to frighten the bourgeois or forge signs, provokes the watch, gets into debt and links himself with that literary Bohemia which centered around Tristan L'Hermite and Saint-Amant and cultivated the memory of Théophile and his impious lyricism.

In his voluminous biography of Charles Coypeau d'Assoucy, Jean-Luc Hennig suggests that the poet-musician had begun around 1636 (at thirty-one) a homosexual relationship with Cyrano, then seventeen. In support of this hypothesis, he notes that both had families from Sens, a lawyer father and religious brothers and sisters, that the elder only liked youths and in regard to the women of Montpellier who accused him in 1656 of neglecting them, he wrote that "all of that has no more foundation than their fanciful imagination, already concerned, which had taught them the long-time habits [that he] had had with C[hapelle], late D[e] B[ergerac] and late C."

Cyrano's homosexuality was first explicitly hypothesized by Jacques Prévot in 1978.

Life and works 

He was the son of Abel de Cyrano, lord of Mauvières and Bergerac, and Espérance Bellanger. He received his first education from a country priest and had for a fellow pupil his friend and future biographer Henri Lebret. He then proceeded to Paris and the heart of the Latin Quarter, to the college de Dormans-Beauvais, where he had as master Jean Grangier, whom he afterwards ridiculed in his comedy Le Pédant joué (The Pedant Tricked) of 1654. At the age of nineteen, he entered a corps of the guards, serving in the campaigns of 1639 and 1640. As a minor nobleman and officer he was notorious for his dueling and boasting. His unique past allowed him to make unique contributions to French art.

One author, Ishbel Addyman, varies from other biographers and claims that he was not a Gascon aristocrat, but a descendant of a Sardinian fishmonger, and that the appellation Bergerac stemmed from a small estate near Paris where he was born, not in Gascony, and that he may have suffered tertiary syphilis. She also claims that he may have been homosexual and around 1640 became the lover of Charles Coypeau d'Assoucy, a writer and musician, until around 1653, when they became engaged in a bitter rivalry. This led to Bergerac sending d'Assoucy death threats that compelled him to leave Paris. The quarrel extended to a series of satirical texts by both men. Bergerac wrote Contre Soucidas (an anagram of his enemy's name) and Contre un ingrat (Against an ingrate), while D'Assoucy counterattacked with Le Combat de Cyrano de Bergerac avec le singe de Brioché, au bout du Pont-Neuf (The battle of Cyrano de Bergerac with the monkey of Brioché, at the end of the Pont-Neuf). He also associated with Théophile de Viau, the French poet and libertine.

He is said to have left the military and returned to Paris to pursue literature, producing tragedies cast in the orthodox classical mode.

The model for the character Roxane in Rostand's play Cyrano de Bergerac was Bergerac's cousin, who lived with his sister, Catherine de Bergerac, at the Convent of the Daughter of the Cross. As in the play, Bergerac did fight at the Siege of Arras in 1640, a battle of the Thirty Years' War between French and Spanish forces in France (though this was not the Battle of Arras, fought fourteen years later). During the siege he suffered a neck wound from a sword during a sortie by the Spanish defenders, a day before the surrender of the Spanish troops and the end of the siege. One of his confrères in the battle was the Baron Christian of Neuvillette, who married Cyrano's cousin. However, the plotline of Rostand's play involving Roxane and Christian is entirely fictional.

Cyrano was a pupil of the French polymath Pierre Gassendi, a canon of the Catholic Church who tried to reconcile Epicurean atomism with Christianity.

Cyrano de Bergerac's works L'Autre Monde: ou les États et Empires de la Lune ("Comical History of the States and Empires of the Moon", published posthumously, 1657) and Les États et Empires du Soleil (The States and Empires of the Sun, 1662) are classics of early modern science fiction. In the former, Cyrano travels to the Moon using rockets powered by firecrackers (it may be the earliest description of a space flight by use of a vessel that has rockets attached) and meets the inhabitants. The Moon-men have four legs, firearms that shoot game and cook it, and talking earrings used to educate children.

His mixture of science and romance in the last two works furnished a model for many subsequent writers, among them Jonathan Swift, Edgar Allan Poe and probably Voltaire. Corneille and Molière freely borrowed ideas from Le Pédant joué.

Death 
The play suggests that he was injured by a falling wooden beam in 1654 while entering the house of his patron, the Duc D'Arpajon. However the academic and editor of Cyrano's works Madeleine Alcover uncovered a contemporary text which suggests an attack on the Duke's carriage in which a member of his household was injured. It is as yet inconclusive whether or not Cyrano's death was a result of the injury, or an unspecified disease. He died over a year later on July 28, 1655, aged 36, at the house of his cousin, Pierre De Cyrano, in Sannois. He was buried in a church in Sannois. However, there is strong evidence to support the theory that his death was a result of a botched assassination attempt as well as further damage to his health caused by a period of confinement in a private asylum, orchestrated by his enemies, who succeeded in enlisting the help of his own brother Abel de Cyrano.

In fiction and media

Rostand 

In 1897, the French poet Edmond Rostand published a play, Cyrano de Bergerac, on the subject of Cyrano's life. This play, which became Rostand's most successful work, revolves around Cyrano's love for the beautiful Roxane, whom he is obliged to woo on behalf of a more conventionally handsome but less articulate friend, Christian de Neuvillette.

The play has been made into operas and adapted for cinema several times and reworked in other literary forms and as a ballet.

Other authors 

The Adventures of Cyrano De Bergerac, by Louis Gallet, was published in English by Jarrolds Publishers (London) in 1900. It bears no resemblance to Rostand's play apart from the characteristics of the de Bergerac character.

Cyrano appears as one of the main characters of the Riverworld series of books by Philip José Farmer. 

Cyrano de Bergerac served as an inspiration for the creation of Saint-Savin, one of the main characters of Umberto Eco's novel The Island of the Day Before.

In A. L. Kennedy's novel So I Am Glad, the narrator finds de Bergerac has appeared in her modern-day house share.

In Robert A. Heinlein's novel Glory Road, Oscar Gordon fights a character who is not named, but is obviously Cyrano.

John Shirley published a story about Cyrano called "Cyrano and the Two Plumes" in a French anthology; it was reprinted at The Freezine of Fantasy and Science Fiction.

The novel by Adam Browne, Pyrotechnicon: Being a TRUE ACCOUNT of Cyrano de Bergerac's FURTHER ADVENTURES among the STATES and EMPIRES of the STARS, by HIMSELF (Dec'd), was a sequel to Cyrano's science fiction, published by Keith Stevenson, 2014.

The Lost Sonnets of Cyrano de Bergerac: A Poetic Fiction by James L. Carcioppolo. Published in English by Lost Sonnet Publishing (Benicia, California) in 1998. Fiction poetry with the premise that Cyrano wrote a sequence of 57 sonnets during the last year of his life. Heavily annotated.

Cyrano de Bergerac is the leading male character in Charles Lecocq's 1896 opéra comique Ninette.

Film 
Most recently his likeness was the center of a musical romantic drama, Cyrano, adapted as a screenplay by Erica Schmidt who had previously written the script as a stage musical of the same name.  Schmidt's husband, Peter Dinklage, starred as Cyrano. The film was widely received with positive reviews and went on to be nominated for awards at the 79th Golden Globe Awards, four nominations at the 75th British Academy Film Awards and a Best Costume Design nod at the 94th Academy Awards.

There is also a popular French film, Cyrano de Bergerac, starring Gérard Depardieu. Additionally, Cyrano de Bergerac is the premise of a 1925 film and a 1950 film.

Bibliography

Original editions

Translations 
 
 
 
  
 
        (The dream is a translation of D'un songe, first published in Lettres diverses.)

Critical editions 
 
 
 
L'Autre monde: I. Les Estats et Empires de la Lune (texte intégral, publié pour la première fois, d'après les manuscrits de Paris et de Munich, avec les variantes de l'imprimé de 1657). — II. Les Estats et Empires du Soleil (d'après l'édition originale de 1662)
The Other World: I. The States and Empires of the Moon (full text published for the first time following the Paris and Munich manuscripts including variations from the 1657 edition). — II. The States and Empires of the Sun (following the original edition of 1662)
 
Le Pédant joué, comédie, texte du Ms. de la Bibl. nat., avec les variantes de l'imprimé de 1654. — La Mort d'Agrippine, tragédie. — Les Lettres, texte du Ms. de la Bibl. nat. avec les var. de 1654. — Les Mazarinades: Le Ministre d'Etat flambé; Le Gazettier des-interessé, etc. — Les Entretiens pointus. — Appendice: Le Sermon du curé de Colignac, etc...
The Pedant tricked, comedy, text from Mss. in the National Library with variations from the edition of 1654. — The Death of Agrippina, tragedy. — The Letters, text from Mss. in the National Library with variations from 1654 edition. — The Mazarinades: The Minister of State roasted; The disinterested Gazetteer, etc. — The sharp interviews. — Appendix: The sermon of the curate of Colignac, etc...
 
Includes an afterword, a dictionary of characters, chronological tables and notes. Illustrated with engravings taken from scientific works of the time.
 
 
 
Includes an introduction, chronology and bibliography
 
 
Republished as:
 
 
 
 
Introduction, chronology, notes, documentation, bibliography and lexicon by Bérengère Parmentier.

See also 
 Asteroid 3582 Cyrano, named after de Bergerac

Notes

References

Biographies 
 
 
 
 Rogers, Cameron (1929). Cyrano: Swordsman, Libertin, and Man-of-Letters. New York: Doubleday, Doran & Company.

Studies of Cyrano or his work

Madeleine Alcover

Guilhem Armand

Pierre-Antonin Brun

Jean Lemoine

Jacques Prévot

Others

Further reading

External links 

 

 
Le Vrai Cyrano de Bergerac – Biography 
Cyrano(s) de Bergerac – Information on fictional portrayals compared to the real person 
The Other World: Society and Government of the Moon – annotated English language edition

1619 births
1655 deaths
17th-century French dramatists and playwrights
French science fiction writers
Writers from Paris
17th-century French male writers
17th-century French novelists
French male novelists
French duellists
French satirists
French people of the Thirty Years' War